José Carlos Tofolo Júnior, commonly known as Alemão (born 2 March 1989), is a Brazilian footballer who plays as a forward for Maringá. He also holds Italian nationality.

Club career

Early career
Alemão started his career at Santos, and signed a professional contract with club in 2005. He made his first team debut on 31 January 2008, starting in a 1–2 Campeonato Paulista loss against Grêmio Barueri, due to Kléber Pereira's injury. Alemão scored his first goal for Peixe four days later, in a 1–1 draw against Paulista.

Udinese/Varese and loans
In July 2008 he was signed by Serie A club Udinese on a reported free transfer, with performance based fees. However, Alemão was not registered in Lega Calcio as the club did not have an extra non-EU signing quota (Udinese signed Ricardo Chará, Dušan Basta, Alexis Sánchez and Odion Ighalo that season but only the last 2 were officially registered in the League Office). Santos also submitted a new contract to Brazilian Football Confederation BID-E system to document a new contract which last until 2011 on 28 July. Alemão was only officially signed for Udinese in June 2009, and never appeared for Santos neither in 2008 Campeonato Brasileiro Série A nor 2009 Campeonato Paulista, due to a dispute with the club's board.

With Udinese, Alemão played for its Primavera under-20 team as an overage player. In July 2010 he was sold to Serie B club Vicenza in co-ownership deal, for €400,000. Alemão made his debut abroad on 20 August 2010, replacing Alain Baclet in the 66th minute of a 0–2 Serie B loss against Atalanta.

On 31 January 2011, he was swapped with Marco Cellini of Varese. In June 2011 Udinese gave up the remain 50% registration rights for free.

Back to Brazil
In January 2012 Alemão returned to Brazil, signing a temporary deal with Grêmio Catanduvense. He moved to Guaratinguetá until December in mid-2012. After scoring regularly he moved to neighbouring Ponte Preta.

After only appearing sparingly in 2013 Série A, Alemão was loaned to fellow league team Vitória. He subsequently was loaned to Chapecoense and Portuguesa in the following year, he scored 8 goals in total in Serie league and State league.

Cruz Azul
On 12 December 2014 Alemão signed for Liga MX side Cruz Azul. He got 3 goals and 4 assists during 14 games but Figueirense wants him to play in the club

Second Return to Brazil
In 2015, he returned to Brazil again for Figueirense. He then signed by ABC and Ribeirão Preto based Botafogo-SP.

FC Eindhoven
In 2016, he moved to Europe again for Dutch club FC Eindhoven.

References

External links
 Football.it Profile 
 

1989 births
Living people
People from Valinhos
Brazilian footballers
Association football forwards
Campeonato Brasileiro Série A players
Campeonato Brasileiro Série B players
Santos FC players
Associação Atlética Ponte Preta players
Esporte Clube Vitória players
Associação Chapecoense de Futebol players
Associação Portuguesa de Desportos players
Figueirense FC players
Serie B players
Udinese Calcio players
L.R. Vicenza players
Cruz Azul footballers
ABC Futebol Clube players
Botafogo Futebol Clube (SP) players
FC Eindhoven players
Eerste Divisie players
Paraná Clube players
Busan IPark players
K League 2 players
Centro Sportivo Alagoano players
Ituano FC players
America Football Club (RJ) players
Brazilian expatriate footballers
Brazilian expatriate sportspeople in Italy
Expatriate footballers in Italy
Brazilian expatriate sportspeople in Mexico
Expatriate footballers in Mexico
Footballers from São Paulo (state)